is a railway station in the city of Hekinan, Aichi Prefecture,  Japan, operated by Meitetsu. The station provides access to the center of Hekinan, Aichi, and specific notable sites nearby include Hekinan Seaside Aquarium, Myōfuku Temple, and the headquarters of Kokonoe Mirin Company, which produces mirin.

Lines

Station layout
The station has a single island platform connected to the station building by a level crossing. The station has automatic turnstiles for the Tranpass system of magnetic fare cards, and is unattended.

Platforms

Adjacent stations

|-
!colspan=5|Nagoya Railroad

Station history
The station became part of the Mikawa Line of Nagoya Railroad in June 1941. The station was renamed to its present name on April 1, 1954. The station has been unattended since 2005.

Passenger statistics
In fiscal 2017, the station was used by an average of 3956 passengers daily (boarding passengers only).

Surrounding area
Shinkawa Elementary School
Shinkawa Junior High School
Kobayashi Memorial Hospital

See also
 List of Railway Stations in Japan

References

External links

 Official web page 
 Hekinan Seaside Aquarium 
 Kokonoe Mirin Company

Railway stations in Japan opened in 1914
Railway stations in Aichi Prefecture
Stations of Nagoya Railroad
Hekinan, Aichi